The Newcastle Herald (formerly branded as The Herald) is a local tabloid newspaper published daily, Monday to Saturday, in Newcastle, New South Wales, Australia. It is the only local newspaper that serves the greater Hunter Region and Central Coast region six days a week. It is owned by Australian Community Media.

Overview
The Newcastle Herald is the Hunter's largest local media organisation, and enjoys a long affinity and reader involvement with the region's residents. It is also well read in Sydney (with readership figures showing a 20% increase in Sydney readership on Saturdays) and interstate, and is usually seen as an accurate record of business and local data for those looking to relocate to the region.

The paper features the only classifieds section published six days a week across the region.

The Newcastle Herald employs more than 310 full-time staff, and injects $17 million into the local economy each year.

History

The Newcastle Herald had its origins in two early newspapers, The Newcastle Chronicle and Hunter River District News and The Miners Advocate and Northumberland Recorder.

Established in 1858, the Chronicle began as a weekly journal carrying mining, shipping, court and some small items of local news. It cost just sixpence. In the years that followed it took on more of the appearance of a newspaper, became a bi-weekly and then tri-weekly, and by 1876 its last edition was priced at two pence.

Some of the paper's first articles document the Newcastle Earthquake of 1868, riots, severe storms and the sinking of Cawarra, the worst shipwreck in Newcastle's history that claimed the lives of sixty passengers on the Brisbane-bound passenger ship. It was also during the paper's infant years that the Newcastle rail line was extended to Watt Street (1858), Newcastle became a municipality (1859), the Miners' Federation was formed (1860) and gas lighting was introduced to the city (1875).

In 1873 in Nelson St, Plattsburg (now part of Wallsend), The Miners Advocate and Northumberland Recorder was first published. Under the guidance of founder John Miller Sweet, the paper flourished and by 1876 it was a tri-weekly selling for three pence and with a circulation of 4,000 copies a week.

John Sweet's father-in-law, James Fletcher, believed the region was ready for a bigger newspaper published daily and persuaded his son-in-law to expand. The Advocate moved to Bolton Street, Newcastle, and on 3 April 1876, the first copies of The Newcastle Morning Herald and Miners Advocate hit the streets. The first Herald and Advocate masthead was ornate and carried a sketch of a colliery pit-top, including poppet head and chimney. Such ornate mastheads stayed with The Herald for 104 years, the last major change being on 6 October 1980, when a more modern and simpler masthead was introduced, dropping the "Morning" and "Miners Advocate" from the title.

As with the Chronicle the first years of The Newcastle Morning Herald and Miners Advocate were to be also marred by tragedy. Some of the first stories printed by the newly named paper included the sinking of Yarra Yarra off Newcastle with no survivors, a fire in Scott Street, deaths at the Greta coal mine, coal strikes and the beginning of the Boer War. Among other stories of local importance were the sinking of the Newcastle-Stockton ferry Bluebell (The Bluebell Collision) in 1934, The Newcastle Tragedy of 1927 and the Japanese attack on the city's East End and dockyards in 1942.

Move to tabloid 
In July 1998, the newspaper rebranded itself as "the compact with impact" after going tabloid in size. According to the newspaper's proponents the move to tabloid was an immediate success, and the newspaper's circulation has grown more than 21 per cent since then. Others have argued that the paper's journalism values suffered and that the paper had become more sensationalist and less analytical as a result. As the Newcastle Herald was one of the first Australian newspapers to switch from broadsheet to tabloid, the paper is often cited as an example when other Australian newspapers are contemplating or alleged to be contemplating a similar move.

Merger 
In mid-2008, the paper was forced to sell its free weekly Post publication to Newcastle Jets FC owner Con Constantine following the merger between Fairfax Media and Rural Press. Rural Press owned the competing Star newspaper and the Australian Competition & Consumer Commission ruled that the conglomerate was not allowed to own two such similar publications. The Star ceased publication in April 2020 due to a drop in advertising revenue as a result of the COVID-19 pandemic.

Awards
Two Herald writers have won the Gold Walkley, the most prestigious of the Walkley Awards for Australian journalism. John Lewis won in 1981 for his articles on the attempted takeover of NBN Television, while Joanne McCarthy won in 2013 for her work on child sexual abuse in the Catholic Church.

See also 
 List of newspapers in Australia

References

External links
 Newcastle Herald homepage

Newspapers published in New South Wales
Mass media in Newcastle, New South Wales
Publications established in 1858
Mass media in the Hunter Region
1858 establishments in Australia
Daily newspapers published in Australia